Babelomurex is a genus of sea snails, marine gastropod molluscs in the family Muricidae, the murex snails or rock snails.

Species
Species within the genus Babelomurex include:

 Babelomurex armatus Sowerby III, 1912
 Babelomurex atlantidis Oliverio & Gofas, 2006
 Babelomurex benoiti (Tiberi, 1855)
 Babelomurex bernardi (K. Nicolay, 1984)
 Babelomurex blowi (Ladd, 1976)
 Babelomurex capensis (Tomlin, 1928) 
 Babelomurex cariniferoides (Shikama, T., 1966)
 Babelomurex cariniferus (Sowerby, 1834)
 Babelomurex centimanus Kosuge, 1985
 Babelomurex cookae Kosuge, 1988
 Babelomurex couturieri (Jousseaume, 1898)
 Babelomurex cristatus (Kosuge, 1979)
 Babelomurex dalli (Emerson & D'Attilio 1963)
 Babelomurex deburghiae (Reeve, 1857)
 Babelomurex depressispiratus Oliverio, 2008
 Babelomurex deroyorum D'Attilio & Myers, 1984
 Babelomurex diadema (A. Adams, 1854)
 Babelomurex echinatus (Azuma, M., 1970)
 Babelomurex fax (F. M. Bayer, 1971)
 Babelomurex finchii (Fulton, H.C., 1930)
 Babelomurex fruticosus (Kosuge, 1979)
 Babelomurex gemmatus (Shikama, 1966) 
 Babelomurex glaber Kosuge, 1998
 Babelomurex habui (Azuma, 1971)
 Babelomurex helenae (Azuma, 1973)
 Babelomurex hindsi (Carpenter, 1857)
 Babelomurex hirasei Shikama, 1964
 Babelomurex indicus (Smith, 1899)
 Babelomurex japonicus (Dunker, R.W., 1882)
 Babelomurex juliae (Clench & Aguayo, 1939)
 Babelomurex kawamurai (Kira, 1959): forms a complex
 Babelomurex kawanishii (Kosuge, 1979)
 Babelomurex kinoshitai (Fulton, 1930)
 Babelomurex kuroharai (Habe, 1970)
 Babelomurex laevicostatus (Kosuge, 1981)
 Babelomurex latipinnatus (Azuma, 1961)
 Babelomurex lischkeanus (Dunker, R.W., 1882)
 Babelomurex longispinosus (Suzuki, 1972)
 Babelomurex macrocephalus Oliverio, 2008
 Babelomurex mansfieldi (McGinty, 1940)
 Babelomurex marumai Habe & Kosuge, 1970
 Babelomurex mediopacificus (Kosuge, 1979)
 Babelomurex meimiaoae S.-I Huang & Y.-F. Huang, 2019
 Babelomurex memimarumai Kosuge, 1985
 Babelomurex microspinosus Kosuge, 1988
 Babelomurex miyokoae Kosuge, 1985
 Babelomurex nagahorii (Kosuge, 1980) 
 Babelomurex nakamigawai (Kuroda, 1959)
 Babelomurex nakayasui (Shikama, 1970)
 Babelomurex natalabies Oliverio, 2008
 Babelomurex neocaledonicus Kosuge & Oliverio, 2001
 Babelomurex oldroydi (I. S. Oldroyd, 1929)
 Babelomurex pallox Oliverio, 2008
 Babelomurex pervernicosus (Suzuki, 1972)
 Babelomurex princeps (Melvill, 1912)
 Babelomurex problematicus (Kosuge, 1980)
 Babelomurex purpuraterminus (Kosuge, 1979)
 Babelomurex purpuratus (Chenu, 1859)
 Babelomurex purus (Kosuge, 1985)
 Babelomurex ricinuloides (Schepman, 1911)
 Babelomurex sentix (Bayer, 1971)
 Babelomurex shingomarumai (Kosuge, 1981)
 Babelomurex spinaerosae (Shikama, 1970)
 Babelomurex spinosus Hirase, 1908
 Babelomurex squalidus Kosuge, 1985
 Babelomurex stenospinus (Kuroda, 1961)
 Babelomurex takahashii (Kosuge, 1979)
 Babelomurex tectumsinensis (Deshayes, 1856)
 Babelomurex tosanus (Hirase, 1908)
 Babelomurex tuberosus (Kosuge, 1980)
 Babelomurex tumidus (Kosuge, 1980)
 Babelomurex virginiae Kosuge & Oliverio, 2004
 Babelomurex wormaldi (Powell, 1971)
 Babelomurex yamatoensis Kosuge, 1986
 Babelomurex yumimarumai Kosuge, 1985

 Species brought into synonymy
Babelomurex asper (A. Adams, 1855): synonym of Coralliophila aspera (A. Adams, 1855)
Babelomurex fearnleyi (Emerson, W.K. & A. d' Attilio, 1965): synonym of Coralliophila fearnleyi (Emerson & D'Attilio, 1965)
Babelomurex fusiformis (Martens, 1902): synonym of Mipus fusiformis (Martens, 1902)
Babelomurex gili Kosuge, 1990: synonym of Babelomurex tectumsinensis (Deshayes, 1856)
Babelomurex multispinosus Shikama, 1966: synonym of Babelomurex spinosus (Hirase, 1908)
Babelomurex multispinosa Shikama 1966: synonym of Babelomurex spinosus (Hirase, 1908)

References

 Coen G. (1922). Del genere Pseudomurex (Monterosato, 1872). Atti della Società Italiana di Scienze Naturali e del Museo Civico di Storia Naturale di Milano. 61: 68–71, pl. 2.
 Kosuge S. (1979) Descriptions of two new subgenus and seven new species of the genus Latiaxis (Gastropoda, Mollusca). Bulletin of the Institute of Malacology, Tokyo 1(1): 3-8, pls 2-3. [30 May 1979] page(s): 3 
 Oliverio M. (2008) Coralliophilinae (Neogastropoda: Muricidae) from the southwest Pacific. In: V. Héros, R.H. Cowie & P. Bouchet (eds), Tropical Deep-Sea Benthos 25. Mémoires du Muséum National d'Histoire Naturelle 196: 481-585. page(s): 519

External links
 Iredale, T. (1929). Mollusca from the continental shelf of eastern Australia. Records of the Australian Museum. 17(4): 157-189
 Dall W.H. (1924). Notes on molluscan nomenclature. Proceedings of the Biological Society of Washington. 37: 87-90

 
Gastropod genera
Muricidae